is a 1992 Formula One racing video game produced by ZOOM Inc. for the X68000 and licensed by FOCA to Fuji Television.

See also
Overtaking
Formula One video games

References

1992 video games
Formula One video games
Japan-exclusive video games
X68000 games
X68000-only games
Zoom (video game company) games
Video games developed in Japan
Video games set in 1992